Jerzy Paweł Jokiel (9 August 1931 – 7 October 2020) was a Polish gymnast. He won a silver olympic medal in 1952.

References

External links
 Profile at sports-reference.com
 Profile at olimpijski.pl

1931 births
2020 deaths
Polish male artistic gymnasts
Gymnasts at the 1952 Summer Olympics
Gymnasts at the 1960 Summer Olympics
Olympic gymnasts of Poland
Olympic silver medalists for Poland
Olympic medalists in gymnastics
Sportspeople from Ruda Śląska
Medalists at the 1952 Summer Olympics
20th-century Polish people